Two ships of the Royal Navy have been named HMS Abundance:

  was a store-ship launched and purchased in 1799; she was sold in May 1823. 

See also
  was a French transport launched in 1780 that the British captured in 1781, took into service as HMS Abondance, and then sold in 1784.

References
 
 

Royal Navy ship names